The Second People's Summit was held in Quebec City, from April 16 to 21, 2001, and was a coalition of unions and non-governmental organizations from across the Americas and marked the culmination of many years of popular organizing throughout the Americas.  It consolidated the expanding movement to confront corporate led globalization.  

The First People's Summit was held in Santiago, Chile in 1998.

Anti-globalization movement